KBBK (107.3 FM, "B-107.3") is a radio station broadcasting a hot adult contemporary format. Licensed to Lincoln, Nebraska, United States, the station serves the Lincoln area. The station is currently owned by NRG Media, which it purchased in August 2007 from Triad Broadcasting. KBBK's studios are located at Broadcast House at 44th Street and East O Street in Lincoln, while its transmitter is located at the master antenna farm at South 84th Street and Yankee Hill Road in the southeast part of the city. (FM translator K233AN's transmitter is located atop the US Bank building in downtown Lincoln.)

References

External links

BBK
NRG Media radio stations
Hot adult contemporary radio stations in the United States
Radio stations established in 1968
1968 establishments in Nebraska